Sher-e-Kashmir University of Agricultural Sciences and Technology of Kashmir is an agricultural university located in Shalimar, Srinagar, Jammu and Kashmir, India. With its main campus and Faculty of Horticulture in Shalimar, Srinagar, the university has multiple campuses, colleges, research and extension centers across the Kashmir Valley and Ladakh Union Territory. The Faculty of Agriculture (FoA) is located in Wadura, Baramulla and the Faculty of Veterinary Sciences and Animal Husbandry (F.V.Sc & A.H) campus is located in Shuhama, Alusteng, Ganderbal.

History
The university was founded in 1982 by an Act passed by the State Legislature of Jammu and Kashmir. It was named after Kashmiri leader Sheikh Mohammad Abdullah who is popularly known as Sher-e-Kashmir (Lion of Kashmir). The name given to the university was "Sher-e-Kashmir University of Agricultural Sciences and Technology" (SKUAST).

Initially, the university had jurisdiction over the entire State of Jammu and Kashmir with its headquarters at Shalimar, Srinagar. When the SKUAST Act came in force, the agricultural education, research and extension training units were transferred to SKUAST from various development departments viz; Agriculture, Animal Husbandry, Sheep Husbandry and Sericulture of Jammu and Kashmir State.

In 1998–99, the territorial jurisdiction of the university was redefined by amending the SKUAST Act 1982 under which a separate agricultural University was established for Jammu Division and named as Sher-e-Kashmir University of Agricultural Sciences and Technology of Jammu (SKUAST-J) with its territorial jurisdiction extended to the entire Jammu Division. The parent University was renamed as Sher-e-Kashmir University of Agricultural Sciences and Technology of Kashmir (SKUAST-K)

Establishment of the university

In 1979, the expert team of Indian Council of Agricultural Research (ICAR) on the proposal of state government recommended the establishment of an agricultural university for the advancement of the agricultural sector in the state. The Act for the establishment of a university under the name and style of Sher-e-Kashmir University of Agricultural Sciences and Technology was passed by the State Legislature in the 33rd year of the Republic of India on 31 March 1982 which came into force on 1 August 1982 with its jurisdiction over the entire State of Jammu and Kashmir and headquarters at Shalimar, Srinagar.

With the establishment of Sher-e-Kashmir University of Agricultural Sciences and Technology (SKUAST) named after great patriotic leader Jenab Sheikh Mohammad Abdullah (popularly known as Sher-e-Kashmir) the agricultural education, research and extension training units were transferred to SKUAST from development departments of Jammu and Kashmir State—agriculture, animal husbandry, sheep husbandry and sericulture. The university operates on the Land-Grant College concept following the Model Act of SAUs evolved by ICAR. It is a multicampus university.

It is a matter of great satisfaction that extremely incoherent and stagnated research infrastructure, an initial customary educational base and non-existent extension education services have given way to an organised institution of SKUAST, which has taken over the responsibility of supporting the state in its effort to develop its agricultural economy in agriculture and allied sectors. There is no doubt that SKUAST has developed faster than many agricultural universities in the country.

In 1998–99, the territorial jurisdiction of the university was redefined by amending the SKUAST Act 1982 under which a separate agriculture university was established for Jammu Division and named as Sher-e-Kashmir University of Agricultural Sciences and Technology of Jammu (SKUAST-J). Sher-e-Kashmir University of Agricultural Sciences and Technology of Kashmir has jurisdiction over Kashmir Valley and Ladakh comprising two agro-ecological zones. These include

 Mid-high altitude temperate zone namely the Kashmir Valley covering the districts of Anantnag, Budgam, Baramullah, Pulwama, Kupwara, Bandipora, Ganderbal and Srinagar which has annual precipitation of 660 to 1400 mm with an average temperature around 13 °C and the altitude ranging between 1500 and 2500 m amsl.
 Cold-arid region of Ladakh comprising the districts of Leh and Kargil which are cold desert with precipitation around 100–120 mm and altitude 2500–5300 m amsl and temperature fluctuating between +40 to -40 °C.

Faculties
The faculties of the university include the following:
 Faculty of Agriculture, Wadura (Sopore), Baramulla.
 Faculty of Horticulture, Shalimar, Srinagar.
 Faculty of Veterinary Sciences and Animal Husbandry, Shuhama, Srinagar.
 Faculty of Sericulture, Mirgund, Baramulla (now renamed as College of Temperate Sericulture)
 Faculty of Fisheries, Ganderbal.
 Faculty of Forestry, Benhama, Ganderbal.
 College of Agricultural Engineering and Technology, Shalimar, Srinagar
Furthermore, there are KVKs (Krishi Vighan Kendras) in every district which are affiliated with the university.

References

External links
Official website

Agricultural universities and colleges in India
Universities in Jammu and Kashmir
Education in Srinagar
Agriculture in Jammu and Kashmir